William Nicholas Sheats (March 5, 1851 – July 19, 1922) was an educator and politician called the "Father of Florida's Public School System." He was state superintendent of public education in Florida from 1893 to 1905, and again from 1913 to 1922.

Sheats was born on a cotton farm near Auburn, Georgia, and referred to himself as a "Georgia cracker."  He earned an A.B. in 1873 and an A.M. in 1876 from Emory University. His career took him from teacher and superintendent of schools in Alachua County, Florida, to his role as superintendent of public instruction for the entire state of Florida. 

Sheats was a paternalistic racist, insisting on segregation between Black and white students in all levels of education. His beliefs led him to lobby the 1894 legislature for a new law to be passed. The Sheats Law, passed in 1895, prohibited white teachers from instructing Black students and forbid Black and white students from learning in the same classroom, even if the schools were privately operated. 

This law affected the only privately operated school in Florida that had integrated, the Orange Park Normal & Industrial School. The law led to the arrest of the school's principal, several educators and patrons, and a minister in 1896. They were "charged with the crime of educating students at a desegregated school."

Sheats died in office in 1922. During his tenure, he fortified Florida's compulsory school attendance law as well as standardized teacher training and textbook selection.

References

External links

1851 births
1922 deaths
People from Gwinnett County, Georgia
Emory University alumni
19th-century American educators
20th-century American educators
Educators from Georgia (U.S. state)
Florida Commissioners of Education